Anne Murray, Duchess of Atholl (17 June 1814 – 22 May 1897), born Anne Home-Drummond and known as The Lady Glenlyon between 1839 and 1846, as The Duchess of Atholl  between 1846 and 1864 and as The Dowager Duchess of Atholl between 1864 and 1897, was a Scottish courtier and close friend of Queen Victoria.

Murray was born at Edinburgh, Scotland, the daughter of Henry Home-Drummond, of Blair Drummond, by Christian, daughter of Charles Moray. On 29 October 1839 she married George Murray, 2nd Baron Glenlyon, at Blair Drummond, thereby becoming Lady Glenlyon. In 1846 he succeeded his uncle as sixth Duke of Atholl, and Anne became Duchess of Atholl.

She served as Mistress of the Robes to Queen Victoria in Lord Derby's short-lived government of 1852. She subsequently served the queen as a Lady of the Bedchamber for almost forty years and was one of Victoria's closest friends. When The Prince Consort died, the Queen came out of the room where he had died and proclaimed, "Oh, Duchess, he is dead!" The Duke of Atholl died in 1864, and Anne became the Dowager Duchess of Atholl. In 1892, when Gladstone again came to power, his policy of Home Rule for Ireland had alienated many of the upper classes, and no lady of ducal rank could be found who was willing to serve as Mistress of the Robes. The post therefore remained vacant, while the Dowager Duchess of Atholl and the Duchess of Roxburghe performed the duties of the office. The duchess and her husband preferred the spelling Athole for their title and residence.

The Duke and Duchess had one child, John Stewart-Murray, 7th Duke of Atholl. The Duchess of Atholl died at Dunkeld, Perthshire, in May 1897, aged 82, and was buried at Blair Atholl.

References

British duchesses by marriage
1814 births
1897 deaths
Ladies of the Royal Order of Victoria and Albert
Ladies of the Bedchamber
Mistresses of the Robes to Queen Victoria
Anne
Burials in Scotland
People associated with Perth and Kinross
Court of Queen Victoria